Ben Duckworth (born 23 September 1974) is a former professional rugby league footballer who played for the Illawarra Steelers, Eastern Suburbs, Balmain Tigers, Wests Tigers and Parramatta Eels.

Playing career
Duckworth made his first grade debut for Illawarra against North Sydney in Round 21 1993.  In 1996, Duckworth joined Eastern Suburbs now known as the Sydney Roosters.  After 2 seasons at Easts, Duckworth joined Balmain and spent 2 years at the club and played for them in their last ever season as a first grade side.

In 2000, Duckworth was one of the few Balmain players signed by the newly formed Wests Tigers which was a merger between Balmain and fellow foundation club Western Suburbs.

In 2001, Duckworth joined Parramatta and played 2 games in their record breaking season as they finished as minor premiers.  Duckworth did not play in any finals games or the grand final itself.

References

1974 births
Living people
Australian rugby league players
Illawarra Steelers players
Sydney Roosters players
Parramatta Eels players
Balmain Tigers players
Wests Tigers players
Rugby league five-eighths
Rugby league locks
Rugby league players from Sydney